Pseudoxenodon stejnegeri, commonly known as Stejneger's bamboo snake or (Stejneger's) mountain keelback, is a species of snake in the family Colubridae. The species was first described from Taiwan where it is widespread. It is also widespread in Eastern China and has been recorded in Yunnan and Hunan too. There are two subspecies:
 Pseudoxenodon stejnegeri stejnegeri Barbour, 1908 – China, Taiwan
 Pseudoxenodon stejnegeri striaticaudatus Pope, 1928 – China

Description
It is oviparous.

Habitat

References

Pseudoxenodon
Snakes of China
Reptiles of Taiwan
Reptiles described in 1908
Taxa named by Thomas Barbour